Sceloporus cryptus, the Sierra Juarez spiny lizard, is a species of lizard in the family Phrynosomatidae. It is endemic to Mexico, where it inhabits drier portions of the Sierra Juárez of northeastern Oaxaca, between 1,800 and 2,500 meters elevation.

References

Sceloporus
Fauna of the Sierra Madre de Oaxaca
Endemic reptiles of Mexico
Reptiles described in 1967
Taxa named by Hobart Muir Smith
Taxa named by John Douglas Lynch